Igors is a given name. Notable people with the name include:

Igors Kazakēvičs (born 1980), Latvian race walker
Igors Kazanovs (born 1963), retired athlete who represented the USSR and later Latvia
Igors Korabļovs (born 1974), Latvian football (soccer) defender
Igors Kozlovs (born 1987), football midfielder from Latvia
Igors Pavlovs (born 1965), professional ice hockey player
Igors Sļesarčuks (born 1976), football striker from Latvia
Igors Savčenkovs (born 1982), football defender from Latvia
Igors Semjonovs (born 1985), football midfielder from Latvia
Igors Sokolovs (born 1974), Latvian hammer thrower
Igors Stepanovs (born 1976), Latvian football defender
Igors Troickis (born 1969), former football defender from Latvia
Igors Vihrovs (born 1978), Latvian gymnast

See also
Igor (disambiguation)
Igor (given name)